Herbert Arthur Johnston (16 April 1902 – 5 April 1967) was a British runner who competed in events ranging from one to four miles.

He won a silver medal in the 3000 metre team event at the 1924 Summer Olympics, together with Bertram Macdonald and George Webber. At the 1928 Summer Olympics he finished eighth in the 5000 metre race.

He continued to contribute to British athletics after he retired from running by coaching several prominent long-distance runners including Jim Peters, who held the world record in the marathon for six years, as well as Stan Cox and Fred Norris. He was a founding member of Herne Hill Harriers and earned his living in the insurance business.

References

1902 births
1967 deaths
People from Dulwich
Athletes from London
British male long-distance runners
British male middle-distance runners
Olympic athletes of Great Britain
Olympic silver medallists for Great Britain
Athletes (track and field) at the 1924 Summer Olympics
Athletes (track and field) at the 1928 Summer Olympics
Medalists at the 1924 Summer Olympics
Olympic silver medalists in athletics (track and field)